Thiru chengannur maha Shivaratri and Parisam vaippu, ”The year 2020 is celebrating the 1815th anniversary of Shivaratri. This function is performed by the people called Alappattu Arayar of Karunagapally in Kollam District of Kerala.The Tamil word 'parisam' means dowry.
Parisam vaippu is a ceremony where the father-in-law of Sri Parameswaran gives feminine gift during the marriage of Goddess Parvathi Devi (Kannaki). This is a ritual of the Araya clan. For the Araya community, the endeavor is not just a godly ceremony but also a great ritual for the marriage of Goddess Parvati, the daughter of the Aryar chief ma naickan of kaverippattanam.tamil nadu.

.  Alappad Aryans” have been performing “Thiru Chengannur Shivaratri” and “Parisam vaippu”. To the Aryan community, the "Parisam vaippu" ritual is not only traditional but is also a grand marriage of their daughter Parvati Devi with the Lord Shiva.

The ritual “Parisam vaippu” and the Shivaratri celebration have been recording by the administrator of the Chengannur temple since A.D 205.

References
Aryanmarum pingamikalum-oravalokanam'- by MB Shiv varman pallavarayar.

Further reading
 Chengannur temple

Hindu practices